Meth Lab Season 2: The Lithium is the sixth solo studio album by American rapper and Wu-Tang Clan member Method Man. It was set to be released on November 13, 2018, but was re-scheduled and released on December 14, 2018. Serving as a sequel to the rapper's previous album, The Meth Lab, it is the second album released through Hanz On Music Entertainment.

The album features various guest performers including Noreaga, Redman, Sheek Louch, Snoop Dogg, and fellow Staten Islanders The Tenderloins (stars of the TV show Impractical Jokers), among others. The latter group would collaborate with Method Man in the ninth season of the show, however, Joe Gatto had left the show by this point.

Track listing
Adapted from iTunes.

Chart history

References

External links

2018 albums
Sequel albums
Method Man albums
Albums produced by Ron Browz
Albums produced by Dame Grease